LeRoy Harrison Carhart (born 1941) is an American physician from New Jersey best known for performing abortions late in pregnancy.  He became famous for his participation in the Supreme Court cases Stenberg v. Carhart and Gonzales v. Carhart, both of which dealt with intact dilation and extraction (also known as "partial-birth abortion"). A former Republican, he was one of the four subjects of the 2013 documentary After Tiller.

Biography
Carhart trained as a physician in the U.S. Air Force, and retired from the force with the rank of lieutenant colonel. He is a graduate of Rutgers University, and a 1973 graduate of Hahnemann University School of Medicine (now Drexel University College of Medicine).

Medical practice
After 21 years as a surgeon in the Air Force, Carhart opened a walk-in emergency clinic in Omaha in 1985. On September 6, 1991, the day of the passage of the Nebraska Parental Notification Law, arsonists targeted  Carhart's farm, setting fire to his home and a 48-stall barn, along with two other buildings and numerous vehicles. The attack killed two family pets and 21 horses. The fire, which had started in seven different locations on Carhart's property, was never declared arson and no one was prosecuted. Carhart stated that he received a note the morning after the fire claiming responsibility and likening the deaths of his animals to the "murder of children". At the time of the fire, abortions had been a small part of Carhart's surgical practice; afterwards, determined not to "cede a victory to the antis", Carhart began performing abortions full-time.

In February 2013, a 29-year-old woman who had been 33 weeks pregnant with a medically abnormal fetus died a day after a four-day abortion procedure at Carhart's clinic in Germantown. The medical examiner listed the causes of death as "amniotic fluid embolism following a medical termination of pregnancy", disseminated intravascular coagulation and fetal abnormalities. The Maryland Board of Physicians found that Carhart was not responsible for the death. The board’s letter followed an investigation by state health officials that reported there were "no deficiencies" in Carhart’s handling of the situation, and that the death could have happened during birth as well.

Court cases
Carhart filed suit against the Nebraska Attorney General, Don Stenberg, because a Nebraska law banned a form of abortion, dilation and extraction (D&X). In Stenberg v. Carhart the United States Supreme Court struck down the Nebraska law with Sandra Day O'Connor providing the swing vote for the five-to-four decision because the law did not allow for the use of the procedure even when the mother's health would be put at greater risk by another abortion procedure.
Carhart is sued by a Virginia woman who suffered near fatal injuries during a 25 week gestation abortion.  
Carhart later filed suit against U.S. Attorney General Alberto Gonzales seeking to strike down the 2003 Partial-Birth Abortion Ban Act, a federal law that is similar to the state law struck down in Stenberg, but while the Court did not officially reverse Stenberg, it upheld the federal ban as not imposing an undue burden on women, the test established in Planned Parenthood v. Casey. O'Connor's successor, Samuel Alito, sided with the four Justices who dissented in Stenberg, creating a five-to-four majority.

References

External links
Carhart's statement after the Stenberg decision
Text of the majority opinion
https://www.law.com/radar/card/norris-v-carhart-jr-et-al-41971022-0/

Physicians from New Jersey
American abortion providers
Victims of anti-abortion violence in the United States
Rutgers University alumni
Drexel University alumni
People from Omaha, Nebraska
Living people
1941 births
Nebraska Republicans
United States Air Force colonels